Sue Hengren Wickner is an American biochemist and geneticist who is a distinguished investigator and the head of the DNA Molecular Biology section of the National Institutes of Health.   Her laboratory is under the National Cancer Institute and is located in the Center for Cancer Research (NCI/CCR).

Education 
Sue earned the B.S. degree from American University and the M.S. from Georgetown University. She studied at the Corcoran School of Art and went on to earn her Ph.D. in 1973 from Albert Einstein College of Medicine of Yeshiva University.  Her dissertation advisor there was Jerard Hurwitz.  She pursued postdoctoral training at National Institutes of Health with Martin Gellert, then joined the Laboratory of Molecular Biology at the National Cancer Institute. She did a sabbatical with Fred Sanger at the MRC in Cambridge UK in 1983.

Research 
Sue Wickner and her coauthors Michel Wright, Reed Wickner and Jerry Hurwitz published an early paper showing DNA replication in the test tube.  They found that the bacterial virus or phage Phi X174 could be converted from single stranded to the double stranded replicative form in the test tube and that the reaction required the gene products of dnaC, dnaE, and dnaG genes of the phage. At NIH, her research has illuminated the action of proteins that utilize adenosine triphosphate (ATP) energy in tiny machines to replicate DNA, remodel proteins, and break down proteins. She has been a major contributor to the understanding of molecular chaperones, proteins that regulate most cellular processes including replication and transcription and response to stress.  Chaperones function to alter activity, refold as well as degrade proteins.  Her citation from election to the National Academy of Sciences notes her most recent contributions to ATP-dependent chaperones for proteolysis (protein breakdown), showing how they participate in stress responses by removing proteins that folded incorrectly and how they degrade regulatory proteins once their signals have been delivered. Since there are some human diseases that result from abnormally folded and/or aggregated proteins, these ATP-dependent chaperones are important in disease treatment development.

Honors and awards 
 National Academy of Sciences Member, 2004
 American Academy of Arts and Science Member, 2002
 American Association for the Advancement of Science Fellow, 2001

Books 
 Lila Gierasch, Arthur Horwich, Christine Slingsby, Sue Wickner, and David Agard. (2016) Structure And Action Of Molecular Chaperones: Machines That Assist Protein Folding In The Cell   World Scientific Publishing Company Pte Ltd, .

Selected works 
 Genest O, Wickner S, Doyle SM. (2019) "Hsp90 and Hsp70 chaperones: Collaborators in protein remodeling." J Biol Chem. 294(6):2109-2120.
 A. N. Kravats, S. M. Doyle, J.R. Hoskins, O.Genest, E, Doody, S. Wickner (2017) “Interaction of E. coli Hsp90 with DnaK involves the DnaJ binding region of DnaK.  Journal of Molecular Biology 429 (6):858-872.  
 O.Genest, M. Reidy, T.O. Street, J.R.Hoskins, J.L.Camberg, D.A.Agard, D.C. Masison, and S.Wickner (2013) “ Uncovering a region of heat shock protein 90 important for client binding in E. coli and chaperone function in yeast.”  Mol. Cell. 49(3):464-473. 
 S. M. Doyle, O. Genest, and S. Wickner (2013) “Protein rescue from aggregates by powerful molecular chaperone machines.” Nat Rev Mol Cell Biol. 14(10): 617–629.   
 M. Miot. M. Reidy, S.M. Doyle, J.R. Hoskins, D.M. Johnston, O. Genest, M.C.Vitery, D.C. Masison, and S. Wickner (2011) “Species-specific collaboration of heat shock proteins (Hsp)70 and 100 in thermotolerance and protein disaggregation.  Proc. Natl. Acad. Sci. USA 108 (17): 6915–6920.   
 O. Genest, J.R.Hoskins, J.L.Camberg, S.M.Doyle, and S. Wickner (2011) “Heat shock protein 90 from Escherichia coli collaborates with the DnaK chaperone system in client protein remodeling. Proc Natl Acad Sci U S A. 108(20):8206-11.
 S. Wickner (1978) “DNA Replication Proteins of Escherichia coli.”  Annu Review of Biochem. 78: 1163–1191.

References 

Year of birth missing (living people)
Living people
American geneticists
American women geneticists
American molecular biologists
Women microbiologists
Members of the United States National Academy of Sciences
American University alumni
Georgetown University alumni
Albert Einstein College of Medicine alumni
Fellows of the American Association for the Advancement of Science
National Institutes of Health people
20th-century American women scientists
21st-century American women scientists